Louis De Geer Concert & Congress  (Swedish:Louis de Geer konsert & kongress) is a concert hall and convention center located in Norrköping, Sweden.  Aside from being the home of the Norrköping Symphony Orchestra, the facilities regularly house various conventions.

It was named after Walloon-Dutch  industrialist Louis De Geer (1587–1652). Louis De Geer came to Sweden in 1627 and settled in Norrköping. De Geer established a formidable workshop industry  and received a monopoly on the copper and iron trade.

The building that is now Louis De Geer Concert & Congress was first erected in 1954  as a paper mill.  It was originally designed by architect Ivar Tengbom (1878–1968). Paper production ceased in 1986. The architects of the concert hall made a point of preserving the industrial character.

References

Related reading
Nováky, György (2003)  Louis De Geer och hans värld (Uppsala: Leufsta vänner) 
Bergström, Anders (2001)  Arkitekten Ivar Tengbom: byggnadskonst på klassisk grund (Stockholm: Byggförl)

External links

Louis de Geer konsert & kongress website

Concert halls in Sweden
Buildings and structures in Norrköping